The 2012 African Men's Youth Handball Championship was the 5th edition of the tournament, organized by the African Handball Confederation, under the auspices of the International Handball Federation and held in Abidjan, Ivory Coast from August 28 to August 26, 2012.

Egypt was the champion and the tournament qualified the top four teams to the 2013 world championship.

Draw

Preliminary round
11 teams were drawn into two groups of five and six, respectively, with the two top teams of each group playing for the title, the two second, playing for the bronze medal, the two third, playing for the 5th place, the two fourth for the 7th place and the two fifth teams playing for the 9th place.

All times are local (UTC+1).

Group A

Group B

Classification matches

9th place game

7th place game

5th place game

Bronze medal game

Final

Final standings

Awards

See also
 2012 African Men's Handball Championship
 2012 African Men's Junior Handball Championship

References

2012 in handball
African Men's Junior Handball Championship
2013 in African handball
International handball competitions hosted by Ivory Coast
Youth